Athletics events at the 2016 Summer Paralympics were held in the Estádio Olímpico João Havelange in Rio de Janeiro, Brazil, from September 2016. 177 events were held across both genders where 1,100 athletes competed. The athletics programme was the largest element of the Games programme in terms of entrants and medals awarded.

Classification and events

Athletes are given a classification depending on the type and extent of their disability. The classification system allows athletes to compete against others with a similar level of function.

The athletics classifications are:
11–13: Blind (11) and visually impaired (12, 13) athletes
20: Athletes with an intellectual disability
31–38: Athletes with cerebral palsy; 31-34 for wheelchair events, 35-38 for ambulant (running) events
40-41: Les Autres (others) (including people with dwarfism)
42–47: Amputees
51–58: Athletes with a spinal cord disability

The class numbers were given prefixes of "T" and "F" for track and field events, respectively. High jump and Long jump, while field events, usually attract a "T" classification

Visually impaired athletes classified 11 run with full eye shades and a guide runner, those classified 12 have the option of using a guide, while those classified 13 do not use a guide runner. Guide runners are awarded medals alongside their athletes.

On 9 June 2015, the IPC announced the final make up of the Rio 2016 athletics programme. There were several changes in the programme, including the elimination of triple jump events, and the reduction of events requiring a factoring system, as this was seen to undermine the image of the event as sport.

The following is a summary of all athletics events which took place at the Games:

Event summary table

Schedule

Participating nations
A total of 1,139 athletes from 146 nations competed.

Medal summary

See also
Athletics at the 2016 Summer Olympics

References

 
2016
2016 Summer Paralympics events
Paralympics
2016 Paralympics
2016 Paralympics